Erinothus is a genus of moths of the family Crambidae. It contains only one species, Erinothus lollialis, which is found on Borneo.

References

Pyraustinae
Crambidae genera
Taxa named by George Hampson